Isodemis proxima is a moth of the  family Tortricidae. It is known from China in the provinces of Guangdong, Guangxi and Hainan and in Taiwan.

The wingspan is 16–21 mm. Adults are on wing in late March, mid-April and mid-May.

References

External links

Review of the genus Isodemis Diakonoff (Lepidoptera, Tortricidae) from China, with description of three new species

Moths described in 2000
Archipini
Moths of Asia
Taxa named by Józef Razowski